Jocy de Oliveira (born 11 April 1936) is a Brazilian pianist, multimedia artist and composer.

Biography
Jocy de Oliveira was born in Curitiba and grew up in São Paulo, Brazil. She studied in São Paulo with Joseph Kliass, in Paris with Marguerite Long, and in St. Louis with Robert Wykes. She received a Master of Arts from Washington University in St. Louis.

De Oliveira became a concert pianist as a child, playing internationally with artists including Stravinsky and John Cage. She married conductor Eleazar de Carvalho but later divorced, and lived in St. Louis, New York City and Rio de Janeiro. She is a member of the Brazilian Academy of Music, and is the author of four books.

Honors and awards
Rockefeller Foundation
New York Council on the Arts
Meet the Composer
Foundation of Art and Culture Vitae (Brazil)

Works
De Oliveira composes mainly electronic and multimedia works for video projects, stage and musical theater. Selected works include:

Polinterações I and II (1970)
Música no espaço, planetarium event (1982/83)
Fata Morgana (1987)
Liturgia Thurs Espaço (1988)
Inori à prostituta Sagrada (1993)
Illud Tempus (1994)
Canto e Raga (1995)
Cenas de una Trilogia (1999)
As Malibran (1999/2000)
Medea, Profecia e Balada (2003)
Kseni Estrangeira-A (2003/2005)

Her work has been recorded and issued on CD and DVD, including:
Catalogue d'oiseaux, Olivier Messiaen (Vox)
Vingt regards sur l'enfant-Jésus, Olivier Messiaen (Vox)
Inori à prostituta sagrada Rer BJOCD, ASIN:B000O00HFE
Illud tempus ABM DIGITAL, ASIN:B003ZU8YGE
As Malibrans (2000) ASIN:B00004UAWV

Books
O 3 º Mundo (São Paulo, 1959)
Apague meu spot light (São Paulo, 1961)
Dias e seus Caminhos Mapas e partituras (1983)
Inori - a prostituta sagrada (2003)

References

External links
Official website

1936 births
Living people
20th-century classical composers
Brazilian classical composers
Brazilian women composers
Women classical composers
Brazilian pianists
Women in electronic music
21st-century pianists
20th-century women composers
20th-century women pianists
21st-century women pianists
Washington University in St. Louis alumni